Cape May is a high rock cape along the west side of the Ross Ice Shelf, Antarctica,  southeast of Cape Laird. It was discovered by the British National Antarctic Expedition (1901–04) and named for Admiral of the fleet Sir William Henry May, Lord of the Admiralty and Controller of the Navy, 1901–05.

References

Headlands of the Ross Dependency
Shackleton Coast